The AARP Movies for Grownups Award for Best Actor is one of the AARP Movies for Grownups Awards presented annually by the AARP since the awards' inception in 2002. The award honors the best actor over the age of fifty. The Best Actor Award is one of the seven original trophies issued by AARP the Magazine, along with awards for Best Movie for Grownups, Best Director, Best Actress, Best Foreign Film, Best Documentary, and Best Movie for Grownups Who Refuse to Grow Up.

Winners and Nominees

2000s

2010s

2020s

Multiple wins and nominations

Multiple wins

Multiple nominations

See also
 Academy Award for Best Actor
 BAFTA Award for Best Actor in a Leading Role
 Critics' Choice Movie Award for Best Actor
 Golden Globe Award for Best Actor – Motion Picture Drama
 Golden Globe Award for Best Actor – Motion Picture Musical or Comedy
 Independent Spirit Award for Best Male Lead
 Screen Actors Guild Award for Outstanding Performance by a Male Actor in a Leading Role

References

Actor
Film awards for lead actor